The National Social Security Fund is a Kenyan government agency responsible for the collection, safekeeping, responsible investment and distribution of retirement funds of employees in both the formal and informal sectors of the Kenyan Economy. Participation for both employers and employees is compulsory. The fund is both a pension fund and provident fund.

History
The National Social Security Fund was established in 1965 through the Act of Parliament Cap 258 of the Laws of Kenya. It initially operated as a Department of the Ministry of Labour until 1987 when the act was amended, transforming the fund into a state corporation under the management of a board of trustees. Under the National Social Security Fund Act of 2013, both employed and the self-employed and their dependents qualify as contributing members. The Act on pension requires all Kenyans that are above 18 years of age to register to the program.

The board of trustees is composed of workers' representatives through the Central Organization of Trade Unions, employers through the Federation of Kenya Employers and the Government of Kenya through the Ministries of Labour and Finance. This composition ensures that the board accommodates the views and aspirations of the three social partners in policy formulation and running of the organization.

Investment portfolio
The current National Social Security Fund investment portfolio includes fixed income, real estate, and equities.

Fixed income 
This includes short term and long term bonds. As of 31 December 2010, the investment in long term bonds was KSh.24.64 billion/=.

Real estate 
 Land - as of 31 December 2010, the undeveloped land owned by the fund was valued at KSh.7.86 billion/=.
 Buildings - as of 31 December 2010, the buildings owned by the fund were valued at KSh.31 billion/=.
 Commercial buildings - these include the NSSF Building, View Park Towers, and Hazina Trade Centre which is set to be the tallest building in the region.
 Residential buildings - These include Nyayo Estate Embakasi, Milimani Flats, Mountain View Estate, Hazina Estate and Nyayo Highrise Estate near Kibera.

Equities 
 Private equities - the main private equity held by the fund is 11.2% of the issues share capital of the Consolidated Bank of Kenya. Others include the Nairobi City Council Stock.
 Listed equities - the fund is a leading investor on the Nairobi Securities Exchange, including in the following companies:

Ownership
The fund is owned by the Government of Kenya on behalf of the workers and employers in Kenya.

Governance
Governance is overseen by a nine-member board of trustees with Dr. Anthony Omerikwa as the acting managing trustee. In formulating the fund’s policies the board of trustees acts strictly in accordance with the NSSF Act.

Branch network
There are fund offices in major towns all over Kenya.

See also 
 National Social Security Fund (Uganda)
 National Social Security Fund (Tanzania)
 List of tallest buildings in Nairobi
 Nairobi Securities Exchange

References

External links 
 National Social Security Fund Home Page

Government agencies of Kenya
1965 establishments in Kenya